West Brule is an unincorporated community and census-designated place (CDP) within the Lower Brule Indian Reservation in Lyman County, South Dakota, United States. It was first listed as a CDP prior to the 2020 census. The population of the CDP was 538 at the 2020 census.

Demographics

References 

Census-designated places in Lyman County, South Dakota
Census-designated places in South Dakota